The 76th Ohio Infantry Regiment, sometimes 76th Regiment, Ohio Volunteer Infantry ( or 76th OVI) was an infantry regiment of the Union Army during the American Civil War. The regiment served in the Western Theater, primarily as part of the XV Corps in the Army of the Tennessee.

Organization
Special Order Number 882 of October 1861 authorized Col. Charles R. Woods to organize a regiment of infantry at Camp Sherman, near Newark, Ohio. Recruitment had begun for a Licking County regiment as early as September 1861. Enrollment was for three years' duty. Since the majority of the troops were from Licking County, the regiment had the field nickname of "The Licking Volunteers." The regiment held 962 officers and men when it was mustered in on February 9, 1862. 

The initial officers were as follows:
 Colonel Charles R. Woods
 Lt. Colonel William Burnham Woods
 Major Willard Warner
 Adjutant Jerome N. Rappleyea (1831-1896) 
 Quartermaster Henry D. Wright
 Surgeon Charles R. Pierce
 Asst. Surgeon Thomas B. Hood
 Chaplain Reverend John W. McCarty

Companies

Company A formed November 1, 1861:
 Captain Thaddeus Lemert
• Captain Zebulon Parker Evans 
 1st Lieutenant Bevery W. Lemert
 2nd  Lieutenant Simeon B. Wall

Company B formed November 12, 1861:
 Captain Joseph M. Scott
 1st Lieutenant Ira P. French
 2nd Lieutenant John R. Miller

Company C formed December 4, 1861:
 Captain Levi P. Coman
 1st Lieutenant John S. Anderson
 2nd Lieutenant John V. Gray

Company D formed December 16, 1861:
 Captain Charles H. Kibler
 1st Lieutenant I. Newton Hempsted
 2nd Lieutenant Reason C. Strong

Company E formed December 16, 1861:
 Captain Joseph C. Wehrle
 1st Lieutenant Michael R. Maher
 2nd Lieutenant Charles Luther

Company F formed December 18, 1861:
 Captain Strew M. Emmons
 1st Lieutenant James H. H. Hunter
 2nd Lieutenant Freeman Morrison

Company G formed January 7, 1862:
 Captain James Stewart
 1st Lieutenant Jehile T. Wintrode
 2nd Lieutenant Richard W. Burt

Company H: 
 Captain Jerome N. Rappleyea (1831-1896) 
 1st Lieutenant John A. Dill
 2nd Lieutenant Lucien H. Wright

Company I was originally Company B of the 61st Ohio Infantry. They were transferred to the 76th OVI on February 3, 1862.:
 Captain Edward Biggs
 1st Lieutenant James M. Blackburn
 2nd Lieutenant John H. Hardgrove

Company K:
 Captain James M. Jay
 1st Lieutenant David R. Kelley
 2nd Lieutenant Mark Sperry

Service
During the service time of the 76th OVI, from February 1862 to July 1865, the unit saw action in an estimated 44 battles across eleven Confederate States. Notable events were as follows:

1862
February 9: Mustered in and left Camp Sherman to join the campaign up the Cumberland and Tennessee Rivers
February 14 to February 16: Battle of Fort Donelson
March 6 to March 31: Operations along the Tennessee River and then joined the division of Maj. Gen. Lew Wallace
April 6 and April 7: Battle of Shiloh
April 29 to May 30: Siege of Corinth
August 16: Captured 40 men from the 31st Louisiana at Milliken's Bend, Louisiana
August 18: Captured the steamer Fairplay
October 22 to[November 12: Rest and reorganization at Pilot Knob, Missouri
December 22: joined the Yazoo River expedition of Maj. Gen. William Tecumseh Sherman in the Operations against Vicksburg Campaign
December 26 to December 29: Battle of Chickasaw Bayou

1863
January 9 to January 11: Battle of Fort Hindman
January 23 to April: various movements as part of Grant's Operations against Vicksburg
May 12: Battle of Raymond
May 14: Battle of Jackson (MS)
May 18 to July 4: Siege of Vicksburg
July 10 to July 17: Siege of Jackson
July 23 to late September: camped at Big Black River
October 20 to October 29: destroyed tracks along the Memphis and Charleston Railroad
November 23 to November 25: Third Battle of Chattanooga
November 27: Battle of Ringgold Gap {the colors of the 76th OVI were captured by the 1st Arkansas CSA; the colors were returned to the 76th OVI Veterans by the 1st Arkansas September 20. 1916 
November 28 to December 8: relief of Knoxville, Tennessee

1864
January 1: went to winter quarters at Paint Rock, Alabama
January 4: about two-thirds of the unit re-enlisted as veterans
 January to early March: on furlough in Ohio
 mid-March: return to Alabama
 May to September: participated in the Atlanta Campaign
May 7 to May 13: Battle of Rocky Face Ridge
May 14 and May 15: Battle of Resaca
May 28: Battle of Dallas
June 9 to July 3: Battle of Marietta
June 27: Battle of Kennesaw Mountain
July 22: Battle of Atlanta
July 28: Battle of Ezra Church
August 31 and September 1: Battle of Jonesborough
September 29 to November 3: operations against Hood's Tennessee Campaign in northern Georgia and Alabama
October 18: non-veterans mustered out at Summerville, Georgia
November 15 to December 21: Sherman's March to the Sea
December 21 to January 9, 1865: provost guard in Savannah, Georgia

1865
January 31 to April 1: Carolinas Campaign
March 19 to March 21: Battle of Bentonville
March 24: occupation of Goldsborough
April 10 to April 24: advance on and occupation of Raleigh, North Carolina
May 24: Grand Review of the Armies in Washington, D.C.
July 15: mustered out in Louisville, Kentucky
July 24: discharged in Columbus, Ohio

The 76th OVI mustered out on July 15, 1865.

Commanders 
 Colonel Charles L. Woods - promoted to Brigadier General, August 22, 1863
 Colonel William B. Woods - Brevet Brigadier General, January 12, 1865; promoted to Brigadier General June 11, 1865
 Lieutenant Colonel Reason C. Strong - mustered out with regiment on July 15, 1865

See also

Ohio in the American Civil War

References  

 Dyer, Frederick Henry, A Compendium of the War of the Rebellion. 3 volumes. New York: T. Yoseloff, 1908.

External links
 76th OVI Page by Larry Stevens
 Civil War Soldiers and Sailors System
 History of Licking County, O. (See chapter XXXIX) Must pay to log in.
 National Colors of the 76th OVI

Units and formations of the Union Army from Ohio
Licking County, Ohio
1861 establishments in Ohio
Military units and formations established in 1861
Military units and formations disestablished in 1865